Keret may refer to:

 Legend of Keret, a Ugaritic poem about the life of King Keret of Hubur
 Lake Keret in Karelia
 Etgar Keret, Israeli writer